Events in the year 1853 in Brazil.

Incumbents
Monarch – Pedro II.
Prime Minister – Viscount of Itaboraí (until 6 September), Marquis of Paraná (starting 6 September).

Events

Births

Deaths

References

 
1850s in Brazil
Years of the 19th century in Brazil
Brazil
Brazil